Battle for the Park is the seventh (and in linear terms the final) book of The Animals of Farthing Wood series. It was first published in 1992 and has since been included with The Siege of White Deer Park and In the Path of the Storm in the "Second Omnibus" edition (Hutchinson, 1995).

Plot
It is spring in White Deer Park and Dash the young hare, confident that she is quicker than every other animal in the reserve, wants to test her speed properly by running on the downland. She tells Plucky that she will find somebody to help her dig under the boundary fence and the young fox worries about her, but she soon forgets her remark and decides to remain in the reserve. However, when Plucky goes missing Dash employs the rabbits to help her get under the fence to look for him. Meanwhile, the animals discover that several other animals have gone missing from the park including Weasel. They also hear from Toad and Tawny Owl that several brown rats have entered the park and Fox tells everybody to kill any rat they see.

Dash gives up her search and returns to the reserve only to discover that several humans are rounding up various animals using traps. She tells Fox and Vixen who go to investigate and when the humans leave in their van, Dash follows them out of the park gates and chases them across the downland towards a large enclosure surrounded by large walls. When Dash informs the others Fox decides to set up a rescue party to go and help their friends who have been captured. Fox also puts Badger in charge of the animals' battle against the rats, and several more rats arrive at the park and thrive, despite the animals' best efforts to combat the threat.

The rescue party sets off for the second reserve and Tawny Owl flies over the wall to look for Weasel. Plucky hears his calls and fetches Weasel, but neither animal knows of any way in which they can escape so Tawny Owl is forced to leave. The animals continue their battle against the rats, who have also been discovered by the humans, so they decide to temporarily retreat and return to the park when the humans think the threat has gone. Meanwhile, Fox asks Whistler to fly to the new reserve and carry Weasel back to the park, which he soon does, but Plucky is forced to remain behind until he can find a way to escape.

After biding their time in the sewers, the rats return to the park over many nights and soon grow in huge numbers, but their caution means that the true scale of their invasion does not become apparent to the other animals for some time. When the animals become aware of the rats' renewed presence in the Hollow, they launch an attack on them and drive them out of their corner of the reserve. However, several more rats gather at the pond and attack the frogs, but Toad voices his protest and the rats attack him too. The rats' leader, Bully, warns Toad that they will soon take over the whole reserve. As the white deer arrive to drink at the pond, Bully attacks Toad with his teeth and retreats. Whistler arrives at the pond and discovers the badly wounded Toad, who asks the heron to carry him to the Hollow. Whistler does so, but Toad dies soon afterwards.

The animals form another hunting party and continue to attack the rats to drive them away from the Hollow, but more rats keep on coming and they appear to be fighting a losing battle. Meanwhile, Plucky comes up with a plan to escape from the other reserve. After the Warden finishes one of his checks of the reserve, Plucky jumps into the back of his Land Rover and is taken out through the gates, before jumping out and setting off for his home reserve, where he is reunited with the other animals.

The rats continue to overrun the reserve despite the efforts of Adder and Sinuous to kill as many as they can. As the snakes launch an attack, Bully and several of his followers await them and grab hold of Adder as he enters the nest. Sinuous escapes and tells Plucky, who quickly goes to Adder's rescue. He arrives at the nest and negotiates Adder's freedom by promising not to dig into the rats' nest and attack them. Bully then offers Plucky a truce so that all the animals can concentrate on raising their young instead of battling, and makes a plan to attack the animals while their guard is down.

Fox comes up with a plan to alert the Warden of the rats' presence in the park and the animals leave several rat carcasses outside his lodge. Meanwhile, Bully organizes a hunting party of the largest and strongest rats to dispose of Adder, and the rats find Sinuous and attack her. Sinuous strikes and kills Brat, Bully's chief lieutenant, but the other rats gnaw at her body and only release her when they are sure she is dead. The Warden finally becomes aware of the rats and searches for them on his rounds, and the animals are satisfied that he will deal with the threat.

The attacks against the rats have tired Badger out and he finds it difficult to move. A young female badger named Frond, who has been driven out of her home by the rats, discovers Badger's set and asks for shelter, then collects food for him while he is unable to move. Badger enjoys being looked after and Frond stays with Badger to look after him. The Warden finally locates the rats and sets out poison for them, but they are too experienced to take the bait and it achieves nothing.

Bully finally decides to launch his attack on the Farthing Wood animals and the huge colony of rats swarm into their corner of the reserve. Mossy is spotted and killed by Bully's lieutenant, Spike, before Holly notices the attack and alerts Tawny Owl. Soon the battle rages, but the Farthing Wood animals are overrun by the rats so Leveret and Dash head off to alert all the other animals in the reserve, who arrive to join the fight. With the other animals' help the rats are finally forced to retreat and Adder avenges the death of Sinuous by killing Spike. Vixen pursues Bully and crushes him with her jaws, then tosses him over the boundary fence and out of the reserve.

Within hours the park is finally free of the rats and the animals can live peacefully once more. A few days later, Whistler discovers that a fence has been erected along the downland between the two reserves, then sometime after that Dash discovers that part of the boundary fence has been removed and the park continues onto the downland and has been linked with the other reserve, meaning that White Deer Park has become twice as big so there is more space for all the animals to live their lives.

TV series
The events of this book are covered throughout the third season of The Animals of Farthing Wood (TV series), though the sequence of events is changed slightly.

See also

1992 British novels
1992 fantasy novels
Animals of Farthing Wood books
Children's fantasy novels
1992 children's books
Hutchinson (publisher) books